Legislative elections were held in Mexico on 18 August 1991. The Institutional Revolutionary Party won 320 of the 500 seats in the Chamber of Deputies and 61 of the 64 seats in the Senate. Voter turnout was 61% in the Chamber election and 62% in the Senate election.

Results

Senate

Chamber of Deputies

References

Mexico
Legislative
Legislative elections in Mexico
August 1991 events in Mexico